The NBR K Class  is a class of 4-4-0 steam locomotive of the North British Railway.  The first batch (later LNER Class D26) was designed by Matthew Holmes in 1902 and had  driving wheels for express passenger work.  Three more batches (later LNER Classes D32, D33, and D34) were designed by William P. Reid with  driving wheels for mixed traffic work.  This included perishable goods, such as fish from Mallaig and Aberdeen.  They had inside cylinders and Stephenson valve gear.  The D34 locomotives, commonly known as Glen Class, were built with superheaters. The LNER later fitted superheaters to all D26, D32, and D33 engines as well. All engines of the K class are sometimes known as Glen Class, although the designation is strictly reserved to the fourth (D34) batch.

LNER classes

The LNER divided the NBR K class into four classes, as below. It was common practice for the North British Railway to assign similar engines to the same class group, whereas the LNER system allowed only identical engines to bear the same class designation.

LNER Class D26
Twelve engines ordered in March 1902 and built at Cowlairs railway works in 1903. Three were withdrawn in 1922, leaving nine to enter LNER ownership in 1923. These nine had all been withdrawn by July 1926.

LNER Class D32
Twelve engines ordered in 1905 and built at Cowlairs in 1906–07. The LNER began to fit superheated boilers in 1923 and classified the superheated locomotives D32/2. The non-superheated locomotives were classified D32/1.

LNER Class D33
Twelve engines built at Cowlairs in 1909–10. The LNER fitted superheaters to all the D33s between 1925 and 1936.

LNER Class D34
Ten engines built at Cowlairs in 1913. Twenty-two engines built between 1917 and 1920.  All the D34s were built with superheaters. They are known as the Glen Class, as all engines in the group were named after Scottish glens.

Post-NBR
The locomotives passed to the London and North Eastern Railway (LNER) in 1923 and, some of them, to British Railways (BR) in 1948.  BR numbers  were:

 D32, five locomotives, 62445-62454 (with gaps)
 D33, nine locomotives, 62455-62466 (with gaps)
 D34, thirty locomotives, 62467-62498 (with gaps)

Accidents and incidents

Twenty-two people were killed and eight were injured.

Names
The D34s were named after Scottish Glens:

 62467 Glenfinnan
 62468 Glen Orchy
 62469 Glen Douglas
 62470 Glen Roy
 62471 Glen Falloch
 62472 Glen Nevis
 62473 Glen Spean
 62474 Glen Croe
 62475 Glen Beasdale
 62476 Glen Sloy
 62477 Glen Dochart
 62478 Glen Quoich
 62479 Glen Sheil
 62480 Glen Fruin
 62481 Glen Ogle
 62482 Glen Mamie
 62483 Glen Garry
 62484 Glen Lyon
 62485 Glen Murran
 (62486 Glen Gyle)
 62487 Glen Arklet
 62488 Glen Aladale
 62489 Glen Dessary
 62490 Glen Fintaig
 (62491 Glen Cona)
 62492 Glen Garvin
 62493 Glen Gloy
 62494 Glen Gour
 62495 Glen Luss
 62496 Glen Loy
 62497 Glen Mallie
 62498 Glen Moidart

No. 62494 was originally named Glen Gau, but since no glen of that name exists, it was renamed in July 1925, becoming Glen Gour.
Locomotives shown in brackets were withdrawn before Nationalisation.

Preservation

Withdrawals began in 1946 and all the D34s had been withdrawn by 1961.
One, 256 Glen Douglas (BR number 62469) has been preserved by the Scottish Railway Preservation Society. It is now on display at the Riverside Museum in Glasgow.

References

External links 

 Photos of Glen Douglas
 LNER database Class D34
 Class D34 Details at Rail UK

K
4-4-0 locomotives
Railway locomotives introduced in 1903
Standard gauge steam locomotives of Great Britain
Passenger locomotives